Specific kinetic energy is kinetic energy of an object per unit of mass.

It has units of J/kg, which is equivalent to m2/s2.

Energy (physics)